Maragheh (also Romanized as Marāgheh; also known as Marageh) is a village in Bayat Rural District, Nowbaran District, Saveh County, Markazi Province, Iran. At the 2006 census, its population was 398, in 157 families.

References 

Populated places in Saveh County